Elkington may refer to:

People
Elkington (surname)

Places
Elkington, Lincolnshire, England
Elkington, Northamptonshire, England

See also
Elkington Forest, Canada
Elkington & Co., defunct silverware manufacturer in Birmingham, England